St. James Memorial Chapel is a former Episcopal chapel located on the grounds of Howe Military School, in Howe, Indiana.  It was built in 1902, and is a one-story, Tudor Revival style brick building sheathed with a limestone veneer.  It measures 152 feet by 64 feet, and has additions made in 1909, 1914 (Mother's Chapel), and 1955.  The building features a two-story, crenellated corner tower.

It was listed in the National Register of Historic Places on  September 16, 2001. In 2016 the Episcopal Diocese of Northern Indiana disassociated and ended the relationship between the Episcopal Church and Howe Military School. The Chapel is no longer under the care of the Episcopal Church and cannot be regarded as Episcopal.

Chapel crypt burials
Buried in the chapel's crypt are the founders of Howe Military School, John Badlam Howe, (1812–1883) and Frances Marie (Glidden) Howe, his wife. Also buried there are the first four bishops of the Episcopal Diocese of Northern Indiana and the wives of three of them, as follows:
 1. John Hazen White (1849–1925), first bishop, (and also the fourth bishop of the Episcopal Diocese of Indiana and his wife, Louise (Holbrook) White (1858–1928);
 2. Campbell Gray (1879–1944), second bishop, and his wife, Virginia (Morgan) Gray (1886–1978);
 3. Reginald Mallett (1893–1965), third bishop, and his wife, Lucy Atkinson Murchison Mallett (1898–1959); and
 4. Walter C. Klein, fourth bishop (1904–1980).

Other local sites on the National Register of Historic Places
Other sites in Howe on the National register are:
 John Badlam Howe Mansion, which is also known as the Howe Military School Rectory or the Administration Building, located next to the chapel
 Lima Township School
 Star Milling and Electric Company Historic District
 Samuel P. Williams House

See also

List of Registered Historic Places in Indiana

References

External links
Howe Military School website
 Episcopal Diocese of Northern Indiana website
 List of Burials in St. James Military Chapel

Military chapels of the United States
Episcopal church buildings in Indiana
Properties of religious function on the National Register of Historic Places in Indiana
National Register of Historic Places in LaGrange County, Indiana
Churches completed in 1902
Churches in LaGrange County, Indiana